Russel Fish: The Sausage and Eggs Incident is a 2009 comedy short film starring Chris Colfer.

The film won Best Comedic Short at the 2009 AOF International Film Festival, and screened at the 2010 Seattle International Film Festival, the 2009 Austin Film Festival, the 2009 Palm Springs International Shortfest, the 2009 New York Downtown Film Festival, and the 2009 Detroit/Windsor Film Festival, among others. The film was later referenced in the Glee episode "A Night of Neglect", when Santana (Naya Rivera) says to Karofsky (Max Adler), "Two choices: you stay here and I crack one of your nuts, right or left, that's your choice . . .", a show which actor Chris Colfer (who played Russel Fish) also starred in.

Russel Fish was written and directed by Terence Heuston, produced by Eric Almquist and edited by Christopher Hart and Lu Shan Quon.

Plot
Chris Colfer is Russel Fish, an awkward teen who discovers he must pass the Presidential Physical Fitness Test or fail gym class and lose his admission to Harvard.  With the help of his best friend Jorge played by Eddie Ruiz, an aspiring Latino ninja, he must overcome an evil gym teacher and sociopathic bully to achieve his goals.

References

External links
 
 

2009 films
2009 comedy films
2009 short films
American comedy short films
2000s English-language films